No. 222 Squadron (Tigersharks) is a maritime strike unit based out of Thanjavur. It is the first Sukhoi Su-30 MKI squadron based in southern India and is the also the first squadron equipped with air launched BrahMos cruise missile.

History

1971 Indo-Pakistan War

No. 222 Squadron was raised at Ambala on 15 September 1969, with Sukhoi Su-7 aircraft. In July 1971, the Squadron was moved to Halwara, and was soon engaged in combat with the PAF.

The squadron carried out counter-air strikes against Risalewala and Chander airfields with immense success, despite stiff opposition. It provided CAS to ground units in the Dra-Baba-Nanak, Husseinwala and Firozpur sectors. The squadron virtually paralysed the Pakistani armour thrust, due to numerous strikes against enemy gunning positions, armour, and troops, exposing weak flanks to the ground forces.

Short term interdiction missions were directed against rolling stock, rail tracks, marshalling yeards, bridges and enemy convoys. In this the Squadron achieved remarkable success. It conducted photo recon missions against enemy radar positions, deep inside enemy territory.

The Squadron was highly decorated for its role in the war, including one MVC, 3 VrCs, 3 VMs, and two Mentions in Despatches.

Post-War period
In May 1975, the squadron was shifted back to Ambala, and continued to operate there until 1981, when it shifted to Hindon on 14 May 1981. In December 1985, the Tigersharks became the first Indian squadron to be equipped with the MiG 27 Bahadur aircraft. The then Prime Minister, Rajiv Gandhi, visited the squadron and renamed it to its current name, Tigersharks. On 19 May 1989, they were moved to Hasimara where they were active till 2011.

It was reactivated with Sukhoi Su-30 MKI on 20 January 2020 at Thanjavur Air force base with responsibility for Maritime Recconnsainse and Maritime Strike role over IOR region.

Aircraft

Aircraft types operated by the squadron

References

222